Restrepia flosculata, commonly called the small-flowered restrepia, is a species of orchid occurring from Colombia to northwestern Ecuador.

References

External links 

flosculata
Orchids of Colombia
Orchids of Ecuador